is a Japanese manga series written by Hiroshi Negishi and Satoru Akahori and illustrated by Tsutomu Isomata about a girl named Hitomebore Inaho whose grandmother was in love with a vampire. Inaho meets a vampire at an all-girls Catholic high school. The manga was adapted into a 1996 original video animation series and was re-imagined into a 1997 anime televisions series.

Reception

References

External links
 

1996 manga
1996 anime OVAs
1997 anime television series debuts
1998 Japanese television series endings
Anime series based on manga
Kadokawa Shoten manga
Kadokawa Dwango franchises
Satoru Akahori
Shōnen manga
TV Tokyo original programming
ADV Films
Media Blasters